John Posey is the name of:

 John Wesley Posey (1801–1884), American abolitionist
 John Adams Posey (1889–1963), American politician
 John Posey (actor), American actor, father of actor Tyler Posey